Eilat Tze'elim Sports Centre is located in the Tze'elim neighbourhood north-west of Eilat, Israel. The building offers approximately 2,000 square meters on two levels. The entry level includes the main basketball court, a stage for performances and seating. The lower level features a gym, changing rooms, showers, toilets, and machine rooms. Funding for the building, which cost approximately 12 million NIS (about $3.1 million USD), came from the National Lottery and Eilat municipality.

Gallery

References

 Sports Center in the City of Eilat Website

External links

 High-tech architecture
 List of High-tech Buildings

 
Indoor arenas in Israel
Basketball venues in Israel
Sports venues in Southern District (Israel)
Sports venues completed in 2013
Sport in Eilat
2013 establishments in Israel